Platydoris formosa is a species of sea slug, a dorid nudibranch, shell-less marine opisthobranch gastropod mollusks in the family Discodorididae.

Distribution
This species was described from India. It is widespread in the tropical Indo-Pacific from Zanzibar, Africa to Hawaii.

References

Discodorididae
Gastropods described in 1864